Guasca Rugby Clube is a Brazilian Rugby Union club from the city of Porto Alegre, Rio Grande do Sul. Guasca was founded in September 20, 2012.

History 
The Guasca Rugby Clube was born as an idea on September 20, 2012, in Porto Alegre, with the premise of creating a club strongly orientated to keep alive the values of rugby, and aiming to be a different club organization, structure and development of new players in Rio Grande do Sul the first board of directors has Leonardo Vidal as President, as Guilherme Silva as Managing Director and Paulo Barbosa Jr. as Technical Director.

The badge is made with the club's colors, gold and black, featuring the gaucho holding the "boleadera" (traditional gaucho hunting weapon). "Sou bagual que não se entrega assim no más" verse immortalized in the song 'Veterano' by Leopoldo Rassier, is the battle cry of the club that is hailed the end of each practice session and at the beginning and end of their games, meaning 'I am a warrior who never give up' using local and informal terms.

On March 17, 2013 the club held its first match in a friendly against Plananlto Rugby Clube from the city of Passo Fundo. The match was held at Universidade Federal do Rio Grande do Sul in Porto Alegre. The second game was on April 6, 2013 a friendly against Pampas Rugby Clube, the game was held at the Parque do Trabalhador in the city of São Leopoldo.

The first competition to be played by the club was Torneio Pré Gauchão de Rugby, which was held on April 21, 2013 and organized by the Guaíba Rugby Clube, with the support of the Gaucho Rugby Federation and the Municipal Sport and Youth of the Municipality Guaiba . The club became champion of this competition that year was played in the format Rugby Union.

Presidential management
 Leonardo Vidal (2012-current)

Main Titles 
Males
  Torneio Pré Gauchão de Rugby Champion once (2013)

References

External links
 Official website of Guasca Rugby Clube in Portuguese
 Official Facebook of Guasca Rugby Clube
 Official website of Gaúcho Rugby Federation in Portuguese
 Official Facebook of Gaúcho Rugby Federation

Brazilian rugby union teams